Webline Communications was a contact management company based in the United States. It was acquired by Cisco Systems on September 22, 1999.

Webline Communications was founded by Pasha Roberts and Firdaus Bhathena when they were students at The Massachusetts Institute of Technology in Cambridge MA.  Pasha, Firdaus and Webline won the prestigious MIT 50K Entrepreneurial Business contest which provided seed money to begin the company. After winning this contest,  Pasha put his MIT studies on hold to take full advantage of the seed money and focus on making the company financially successful. Pasha is widely credited for the innovation, technology design, architecture, infrastructure and technology decisions around the products.  Pasha returned to complete his master's degree at MIT Sloan.  Firdaus is credited with the sales and marketing of these solutions into business accounts.

Several marquis customers including Fidelity, General Motors, Oracle, Toys "R" Us, and internet retailer Lands End embraced and implemented important Webline solutions.

Webline was sold to Cisco Systems in 1999 and integrated into Cisco's software / call center strategy.

Defunct software companies of the United States
Cisco Systems acquisitions